A citadel is a castle, fortress, or fortified center.

Citadel may also refer to:

Places
Citadel of Erbil , a palace in Erbil, iraq
 Citadel of Aleppo, a palace in Aleppo, Syria
 Citadel, Calgary, a neighbourhood in Calgary, Alberta, Canada
 Citadel Hill (Fort George), a fortified hill in Halifax, Nova Scotia, Canada
 Citadel Island, Victoria, Australia

Arts and entertainment

Fictional entities
 Citadel (comics), a fictional alien empire in the DC Comics universe
 Citadel, in Oldtown, a library and medical school run by maestres, in George R.R. Martin's A Song of Ice and Fire universe
 Citadel (Half-Life), headquarters for Wallace Breen in City 17 in Half-Life 2

Film and television
 Citadel (film), a 2012 film
 Citadel (TV series), an upcoming Amazon Prime Video series

Gaming
 Citadel (video game), by Superior Software
 Citadels (card game), a German-style card game
 Citadels (video game), a 2013 Arthurian video game

Literature
 Citadel (2011 novel), a novel by science fiction writer John Ringo
 Citadel (1957), a non-fiction book by William S. White

Music
 Citadel (Ne Obliviscaris album)
 Citadel (Starcastle album)
 Citadel, an album by Muslimgauze
 "Citadel" (song), a song by the Rolling Stones

Brands and enterprises
 Citadel Broadcasting, an American broadcast holding company
 Citadel Films, a defunct Indian film studio
 Citadel LLC, a hedge fund management company
 Citadel Miniatures, a miniatures company owned by Games Workshop
 Citadel Press, a publishing company
 Citadel Records, an Australian independent record label
 Citadel Theatre, Edinburgh, Scotland

Computing
 Citadel (malware), a ZeuS-based botnet alleged to have stolen over US$500,000,000 from personal bank accounts
 Citadel (software), a BBS software
 Citadel/UX, an implementation of Citadel that has evolved into a modern groupware platform

Other uses
 Armored citadel, protective enclosure in a ship
 Halifax Citadels, a defunct American Hockey League team
 Operation Citadel, part of the World War II Battle of Kursk
 Salvation Army citadel, a Salvation Army meeting place

See also
 Citadelle (disambiguation)
 Cittadella (disambiguation)
 Royal Citadel (disambiguation)
 The Citadel (disambiguation)